Charles Allen "Charlie" Waller (born November 5, 1948) is a Southern Gospel singer, promoter and producer. Waller is also the former director of the SGMA Hall of Fame. Waller currently manages and sings lead for the Florida Boys quartet.

In 2007, the mantel of the Florida Boys was passed to Charlie by Les Beasley to continue on the legacy of the quartet. In 2009, Waller was inducted into the SGMA Hall of Fame.

References

External links
 The Florida Boys quartet

Southern gospel performers
American male singers
Living people
American gospel singers
1948 births